The International Ornithologists' Union, formerly known as the International Ornithological Committee, is a group of about 200 international ornithologists, and is responsible for the International Ornithological Congress and other international ornithological activities, undertaken by its standing committees.

International Ornithological Congress
The International Ornithological Congress series forms the oldest and largest international series of meetings of ornithologists. It is organised by the International Ornithologists' Union. The first meeting was in 1884; subsequent meetings were irregular until 1926 since when meetings have been held every four years, except for two missed meetings during and in the immediate aftermath of the Second World War.

Meetings

See also
 Birds of the World: Recommended English Names, a book written by Frank Gill and Minturn Wright on behalf of the IOC.

Notes
a.

External links
 Official website
 Proceedings of the IOCongress™
 IOC World Bird List
 IOC classification

Ornithological organizations
Ornithological conferences